Margaret Cameron may refer to:

 Margaret Cameron (author) (1867–1947), American author
 Margaret Cameron (jurist), Canadian jurist
 Margaret Cameron (librarian) (born 1937), Australian librarian, administrator and ornithologist
 Julia Margaret Cameron (1815–1879), British photographer

See also 

 Kathleen Lindsay (1903–1973), English author of romance novels who wrote under this name.